Amin-ur-Rehman (born 22 September 1983) is a Pakistani cricketer. He played 50 first-class and 55 List A matches between 2000 and 2016. He was also part of Pakistan's squad for the 2002 Under-19 Cricket World Cup.

A wicket-keeper, for some time he was on the fringe of the national team. The Pakistan coach Bob Woolmer said of him: "He has the best pair of hands I have seen among Pakistani keepers but his fitness level is appalling. I told him [to] get fit. You will then walk into the national side."

References

External links
 

1983 births
Living people
Pakistani cricketers
Karachi cricketers
Cricketers from Karachi